José Geraldo Loiola (born March 28, 1970 in Vitória) is a male beach volleyball player from Brazil, who won the gold medal at the 1999 Beach Volleyball World Championships in Marseille, France, partnering Emanuel Rego.

Loiola represented his native country at the 2000 Summer Olympics in Sydney, Australia, and added a silver medal to his tally a year later at the 2001 Beach Volleyball World Championships in Klagenfurt, alongside Ricardo Santos.

References
 Jose Loiola at the Beach Volleyball Database

1970 births
Living people
Brazilian men's beach volleyball players
Beach volleyball players at the 2000 Summer Olympics
Olympic beach volleyball players of Brazil